Pallapalayam may refer to places in India:

 Pallapalayam, Erode
 Pallapalayam, Coimbatore